Chinnakkampalayam is a panchayat town in Tirupur district  in the state of Tamil Nadu, India.

Demographics
 India census, Chinnakkampalayam had a population of 10,837. Males constitute 51% of the population and females 49%. Chinnakkampalayam has an average literacy rate of 52%, lower than the national average of 59.5%; with male literacy of 60% and female literacy of 44%. 9% of the population is under 6 years of age.

References

Cities and towns in Erode district